Tafraout, Médéa is a town and commune in Médéa Province, Algeria. According to the 2008 census, it has a population of 8,901.

References

Communes of Médéa Province